Killigrew is a surname of Cornish origin. Notable people with this surname include:

 Alan Killigrew (1919–2001), Australian Rules footballer and coach
 Anne Killigrew (1660–1685), English poet and painter, lady-in waiting to the Duchess of York
  Anne Killigrew (1607–1641), English Lady-in-Waiting to Queen Henrietta Maria; wife of George Kirke
 Catherine Killigrew (1618–1689)
 Lady Catherine Killigrew (c.1530–1583), English scholar
 Elizabeth Killigrew, Viscountess Shannon (1622–1680), wife of Francis Boyle and mistress to Charles II of England
 Henry Killigrew (disambiguation), several people
 Sir Robert Killigrew (1580–1633), English courtier and MP
 Thomas Killigrew (1612–1683), dramatist and theatre manager
 William Killigrew (disambiguation), several people

See also
 John F. Killgrew (1894–1968), New York assemblyman